Miodrag "Mile" Novković (Serbian Cyrillic: Миодраг "Миле" Новковић; born 14 December 1950) is a retired Yugoslav footballer.

References

1950 births
Red Star Belgrade footballers
SV Eintracht Trier 05 players
Yugoslav First League players
Living people
Yugoslav footballers
Association football midfielders